Konstantinos Metaxas (born 21 May 1916) was a Greek athlete. He competed in the men's javelin throw at the 1936 Summer Olympics.

References

External links
 

1916 births
Possibly living people
Athletes (track and field) at the 1936 Summer Olympics
Greek male javelin throwers
Olympic athletes of Greece
Place of birth missing
20th-century Greek people